Králíky is a town in Ústí nad Orlicí District in the Pardubice Region of the Czech Republic. It has about 4,000 inhabitants. The historic town centre is well preserved and is protected by law as an urban monument zone.

Administrative parts
Villages of Červený Potok, Dolní Boříkovice, Dolní Hedeč, Dolní Lipka, Heřmanice, Horní Boříkovice, Horní Hedeč, Horní Lipka, Kopeček and Prostřední Lipka are administrative parts of Králíky.

Geography
The Tichá Orlice river flows through the western part of the municipal territory. The Králický Pond is located south of the town.

Králíky lies on the border between the Hanušovice Highlands and the Kłodzko Valley. The northernmost tip of the territory lies in the Snieznik Mountains.

History

14th–17th centuries
The first written mention of the area is from 1367. It is a record preserved in the country's tables of law, by which Charles IV presented the castle of Žampach and the mountains belonging to it to Čeněk of Potštejn. However, this record concerns only some unspecified mines.

The town was founded as late as in the 16th century and the first written mention is from 1568. In 1577 the town and ten neighbouring villages were bought by Zdeněk of Waldstein. He chose the town of Králíky as the residence of his new manor and began to develop it. Except the manor house, vicarage and Protestant oratory (today's Church of Saint Michael the Archangel), he had the square built into today's shape and on his request Rudolf II, Holy Roman Emperor granted the town a privilege to hold three annual fairs. In the surroundings iron ore was probably mined and perhaps silver, and at that time the town was supposed to get two crossed mining hammers with a sword into its heraldry. There was an attempt to revive mining in the 17th century but it is believed to have been unsuccessful. The industry has never been restarted.

18th–20th centuries
Near the curative springs above the town, Bishop Tobias Johannes Becker, a local native, had a monumental pilgrimage complex built in 1696–1710. A lot of visitors came to this pilgrimage place and poor inhabitants of the Králíky region made a living from these pilgrimages. Production and sale of souvenirs boomed. Wood carving began to develop, and Christmas cribs and wooden characters that have found their way all over the world are reminders of this. Organ building and weaving also developed. Many cathedrals and churches all over Bohemia feature organs from the organ masters of Králíky, one of the greatest being in Prague's Loreta. Weaving played an important role in the originating of a textile tradition, and Králíky canvas was successfully sold all over the country.

In the 18th century the town suffered from fires, plague and wars. Though no major battles took place in the region, the town suffered from the crossings of armies. Fights, plunderings and bribery took place here, as well as in other parts of the country. During the biggest fires in 1708 and 1767 a major part of the town burned down, including the most important buildings. The original wooden houses were replaced by stone ones. After Kłodzko Land was surrendered to Prussia, many of its inhabitants moved to Králíky and the town began to grow. In 1899, the railway was built.

As part of Bohemia, from 1804 the town was part of the Austrian Empire, and then the Austrian part of Austria-Hungary after the compromise of 1867, within which it was administratively located in the Senftenberg – Žamberk District, one of the 94 Bezirkshauptmannschaften in Bohemia. Following World War I, in 1918, the Czechs regained independence, and the town became part of Czechoslovakia.

From 1938 to 1945, it was occupied by Nazi Germany and administered as part of Reichsgau Sudetenland. In 1944–1945, the Germans operated a subcamp of the Gross-Rosen concentration camp, whose prisoners were mostly Poles and Russians. The German speaking population was expelled in 1945 in accordance with the Potsdam Agreement and replaced by Czechs.

Sights

The Hora Matky Boží Monastery pilgrimage complex is formed by the monastery, the Church of the Assumption of the Virgin Mary and the Memorial to the Victims of Internment in 1948–1961. The monastery includes Chapel of the Holy Stairs with cloisters, a crypt, and a pilgrimage house. The way from the town to the complex is lined with Stations of the Cross.

The historic centre of Králíky contains preserved burgher houses and baroque Church of Saint Michael the Archangel.

The area of Králíky and Prostřední Lipka is known for the Military Museum and many remains of Czechoslovak fortification system from 1935–1938 open to the public, including Hůrka artillery fortress or U Cihelny infantry cabin.

Notable people
Hans Neuburg (1904–1983), graphic designer

Twin towns – sister cities

Králíky is twinned with:
 Międzylesie, Poland
 Solbiate Olona, Italy
 Villmar, Germany

References

External links

Cities and towns in the Czech Republic
Populated places in Ústí nad Orlicí District